Randall Salerno (January 4, 1963 – January 24, 2008) was an American news anchor for CBS news in Chicago, Illinois at WBBM-TV.  Salerno had previously worked at WGN-TV alongside Roseanne Tellez at both WBBM-TV and WGN-TV 1993-2004.

Biography
Salerno served as a general assignment reporter and as the weekend morning news anchor from 1994 till 1999. 
 
Before working at WGN, Salerno was a reporter and weekend anchor at WNYT in Albany, New York. Prior to that, he worked at WMBD-TV and WHOI-TV in Peoria, Illinois. He began his broadcasting career at WIFR-TV in Rockford, Illinois as a general assignment reporter.

Salerno received his B.S. in Communication from Illinois State University in 1985, where he was an anchor/reporter for the campus TV station. He lived in Crystal Lake, Illinois, where he attended Crystal Lake South High School and played basketball.

Death

Salerno died in a snowmobile accident on the night of January 24, 2008, on Plum Lake near Sayner/Eagle River, Wisconsin. Salerno was a passenger on a snowmobile when the snowmobile struck a tree.

Salerno is survived by his wife Irene and 3 children.

Awards
Randy Salerno won a local Emmy Award for his work on CBS 2's 2004 broadcast of the LaSalle Bank Chicago Marathon.

References

Friend charged in snowmobiling death of Channel 2 anchor Randy Salerno; January 25, 2008; Chicago Tribune, Retrieved January 25, 2008

External links

1963 births
2008 deaths
Television anchors from Chicago
People from Aurora, Illinois
Sports deaths in Wisconsin
Illinois State University alumni
People from Crystal Lake, Illinois
Journalists from Illinois
20th-century American journalists
American male journalists